Abolition of serfdom in Poland occurred over a period of time. At the end of 18th century a reform movement in Poland resulted in the Constitution of May 3, 1791 which took the peasantry under protection of state (the Constitution was later overthrown in 1792 by Polish magnates supported by hostile Russian Government). Full abolishment of serfdom was enacted by the Proclamation of Połaniec on 7 May 1794, but it was also short-lived as Poland got partitioned by her neighbours in 1795, beginning first 12 years of Polish inexistence as an independent state (1795- 1807) and later another 103 years (1815- 1918). In the 19th century various reforms on Polish territories were taking place. Namely in all three of the Austrian partition, Prussian partition and the Russian partition. Serfdom was abolished in Prussia in 1807, in Austria in 1848, in Russia in 1861 (1864 in Congress Poland). Despite these facts 7 May 1794 remains the date serfdom was abolished in Poland.

After First Partition
After the First Partition of Poland of 1772, Polish peasants who found themselves in the Austrian borders noticed some changes, particularly after the Serfdom Patent of 1781. The reformed serfdom granted peasants hereditary ownership of land, they could not be removed from the land without a court order, the serfdom was limited to three days a week, the serf children could seek education outside agriculture, and the government control and administration was extended to the serfs. But still peasants could not buy the lands on their own.

Frederick the Great having gained a significant amount of land in the first partition of Poland, proceeded to introduce reforms in them which also included abolition of serfdom. The Polish peasants who found themselves in the Prussian borders noticed some small improvements, as the peasants couldn't be removed from land without a court order; they had the right to buy themselves out of serfdom, and send children to education aimed at attaining positions outside agriculture. German colonists were however given preferential treatment compared to Polish peasants. Either way, the Prussian reforms were not going as far as the Austrian ones. On the other hand, they were later discriminated because of their nationality (e.g. Drzymała's wagon and the German Kulturkampf measures).

The Polish peasants who found themselves in the Russian borders were subject to an even harsher serfdom demands than they had in Poland. They also had to serve in the Imperial Russian Army.

In the 19th century
Serfdom was abolished in the Duchy of Warsaw on July 22, 1807, and in Prussia later that year on November 11, 1807. The reforms of the Congress Kingdom of Poland did not change the peasant situation significantly. The years 1830-1850 saw a raising conflict between the serfs, anti-serfdom activists and pro-serfdom governments, with increasing unrest and peasant rebellions particularly in Prussia and Austria. In Prussia, numerous smaller reforms improved the situations of peasants over the 19th century. In Austria, the reforms were spurred by the Kraków Uprising of 1846 and the Spring of Nations in 1848, resulting in the abolishment of serfdom in 1848. In 1846, in Congress Poland peasants gained protection from being removed from their land, and several other beneficial changes were also implemented. At the same time, unrest in the villages continued, affecting about 20% of those still under serfdom. Following the Emancipation reform of 1861 of Western Krai and the January Uprising of 1863-1864, an emancipation reform was introduced that went beyond that of the Russian Empire. In particular, peasants were allowed to regain some territories that they were removed from in the past.

In Austria and Russia, many reforms improving the peasant situation on the Polish territories were spurred by, and accelerated by the governments desire to ensure peasant support for them, instead of the Polish activists, and to deny the Polish activists the additional support from the simmering peasant unrest.

See also

Organic work
Folwark
Połaniec Manifesto
Positivism in Poland
Abolition of serfdom in Livonia

References

Economic history of Poland
19th century in Poland
Serfdom
1790s in the Polish–Lithuanian Commonwealth